The Belarusian Auxiliary Police was a collaborationist paramilitary force established in July 1941. Staffed by local inhabitants from German-occupied Belarus, it had similar functions to those of the German Ordnungspolizei in other occupied territories.

The activities of the formation were supervised by defense police departments, local commandants' offices, and garrison commandants. The units consisted of one police officer for every 100 rural inhabitants and one police officer for every 300 urban inhabitants. Ordnungspolizei was in charge of guard duty, and included both stationary and mobile posts plus groups of orderlies. It was subordinate to the defense police leadership.

Activities
Belarusian Auxiliary Police participated in civilian massacres across villages on the territory of modern-day Belarus; dubbed the anti-partisan actions. The role of the local policemen was crucial in the totality of procedures, as only they – wrote Martin Dean – knew the identity of the Jews.

The German Order Police battalions as well as Einsatzgruppen carried out the first wave of killings. The pacification actions were conducted using experienced Belarusian auxiliary guards in roundups (as in Gomel, Mazyr, Kalinkavichy, Karma). The Belarusian police took on a secondary role in the first stage of the killings. The ghettoised Jews were controlled and brutalized before mass executions (as in Dobrush, Chachersk, Zhytkavichy).

After a while the auxiliary police, being locals, not only led the Jews out of the ghettos to places of massacres but also took active part in the shooting actions. Such tactic was successful (without much exertion of force) in places where the destruction of the Jews was carried out in early September, and throughout October and November 1941. In winter 1942, a different tactic was used – the killing raids in Zhlobin, Pietrykaw, Streszyn, Chachersk. The role of the Belarusian police in the killings became particularly noticeable during the second wave of the ghetto liquidation actions, starting in February–March 1942.

During Operation Cottbus which began on 20 May 1943 in the areas of Begoml, Lyepyel and Ushachy, a number of Belarusian auxiliary police battalions took part in the mass murder of unarmed civilians (predominantly Jews), along with the SS Special Battalion Dirlewanger and other destruction units. They included the 46th Belarusian Battalion from Novogrodek, the 47th Belarusian Battalion from Minsk, the 51st Belarusian Battalion from Volozhin, and the 49th Belarusian Battalion also from Minsk.

List of battalions
Schutzmannschaft Bataillon 46 (weißruthenische). Formed in July 1942.

Schutzmannschaft Bataillon 47 (weißruthenische). Formed in July 1942.

Schutzmannschaft Bataillon 48 (weißruthenische). Formed in July 1942.

Schutzmannschaft Bataillon 49 (weißruthenische). Formed in September 1942.

Schutzmannschaft Bataillon 60 (weißruthenische). Used to form Schutzmannschaft Bataillon 64 (weißruthenische) and used to form Schutzmannschaft-Brigade Siegling in July 1944 which in turn formed 30. Waffen-Grenadier-Division der SS in August.

Schutzmannschaft Bataillon 65 (weißruthenische). Formed in February 1944.

Schutzmannschaft Bataillon 66 (weißruthenische). Formed in February 1944.

Schutzmannschaft Bataillon 67 (weißruthenische). Formed in February 1944.rm Schutzmannschaft-Brigade Siegling in July 1944 which in turn formed 30. Waffen-Grenadier-Division der SS in August.
Schutzmannschaft Bataillon 68 (weißruthenische). Formed in February 1944.

Schutzmannschaft Bataillon 69 (weißruthenische). Formed in March 1944.

Legacy
Little is known about the specifics of the wartime atrocities committed by the Belarusian Auxiliary Police in the vast number of small communities both across the territories of Poland annexed by the Soviet Union and in Soviet Belarus because the Belarusian police's involvement in the Holocaust is not acknowledged publicly in the country. Article 28 in the Constitution of the Republic of Belarus, under the "Procedures Governing Access to Documents Containing Information Relating to the Secret Life of Private Citizens" (added in July 1996) denies access to information about Belarusians who served with the Nazis. "The official memorial narrative allows only a pro-Soviet version of the resistance to the German invaders."

References

Belarusian collaboration with Nazi Germany
Belarus in World War II
The Holocaust in Belarus
The Holocaust in Poland
Local participation in the Holocaust
Defunct law enforcement agencies of Belarus
Military history of Belarus during World War II
Military history of Germany during World War II
Schutzmannschaft